St. Louis Catholic Church is a historic Roman Catholic church in North Star, Ohio, United States.  Constructed in the early twentieth century, it is one of the newest churches in a heavily Catholic region of far western Ohio, but it has been recognized as a historic site because of its unique architecture.

Parish history

By the early 1910s, the parish had decided to move to North Star, and its new building was completed in the village in 1914. Still remaining at the church's original site is the parish cemetery, which lies at the intersection of Mangen and North Star-Fort Loramie Roads.

Architecture
The church is a rectangular, single-story structure with multiple gables and an off-center square bell tower.  Walls of white-painted stucco rest on a concrete foundation and are topped by an asphalt roof.  The interior is lit by windows of many shapes and sizes: a rose window is located above the entrance, wide stained glass windows topped with rounded arches line the walls, and narrow rectangular windows appear in the tower.  While the church reflects a range of architectural styles, many of its elements, such as the cornices on the bell tower, bear evidence of the French Renaissance style.  No other Catholic church in the region resembles St. Louis Church; the ecclesiastical architecture of the region typically employs the Gothic Revival style.

Rectory

Adjacent to the church on the west is a brick rectory; built in 1914, it replaced a small wooden rectory that has since been moved to a different part of the village.  Constructed in a vernacular style, it is a square two-story structure with an ashlar foundation and an enclosed front porch.  A hip roof of asbestos shingle, pierced by multiple dormers, covers the building.  Among its most striking features is a stone cross, located between the second-story windows on the front of the house.

Recent history
In 1977, the church and rectory were recorded by an architectural survey, the Ohio Historic Inventory; it assessed both buildings as being in good condition without any threats to their integrity.  Two years later, the buildings were listed together on the National Register of Historic Places because of their architectural significance.  Twenty-five other churches, including two others in northeastern Darke County, were listed on the National Register at the same time as part of a multiple property submission of properties in western Ohio related to the Missionaries of the Precious Blood.  St. Louis's architecture is highly distinctive from and unique among the other churches of the area.  In contrast to the French architecture of St. Louis Church, most of these churches feature tall Gothic Revival towers visible from a significant distance.  The massive towers of the Gothic Revival churches are the namesakes for this region of western Ohio, which has been nicknamed the "Land of the Cross-Tipped Churches."

Today, St. Louis Church is an active parish of the Archdiocese of Cincinnati.  It is clustered with St. Remy parish in Russia and St. Nicholas parish in Osgood, and the entire cluster is part of the Sidney Deanery.

References

Religious organizations established in 1892
Roman Catholic churches completed in 1914
20th-century Roman Catholic church buildings in the United States
Churches in Darke County, Ohio
Churches in the Land of the Cross-Tipped Churches
Churches in the Roman Catholic Archdiocese of Cincinnati
National Register of Historic Places in Darke County, Ohio
Renaissance Revival architecture in Ohio